Motovsky Gulf (Motovsky zaliv) is a body of water off the northwestern coast of the Kola Peninsula, Murmansk Oblast, Russia. The Titovka River flows to the gulf.

Gulfs of Russia
Gulfs of the Arctic Ocean
Bays of Murmansk Oblast